Lernarot is a village in the Ashtarak Municipality of the Aragatsotn Province of Armenia. It had a population of 430 from 2009–2009.

References 

Report of the results of the 2001 Armenian Census

Populated places in Aragatsotn Province